Constantin Ioachim Moldoveanu (17 August 1913 – 31 July 1981) was a Romanian football forward who played for Romania in the 1938 FIFA World Cup. He spent most of his career playing for Rapid București.

Honours
Rapid București
Cupa României (6): 1936–37, 1937–38, 1938–39, 1939–40, 1940–41, 1941–42

References

External links

FIFA profile

1913 births
Romanian footballers
Romania international footballers
Association football forwards
ACF Gloria Bistrița players
FC Rapid București players
Liga I players
Liga II players
1938 FIFA World Cup players
1981 deaths
People from Ocna Mureș